Villanova del Sillaro is a comune (municipality) in the Province of Lodi in the Italian region Lombardy, located about  southeast of Milan and about  south of Lodi.

Villanova del Sillaro borders the following municipalities: Pieve Fissiraga, Massalengo, Sant'Angelo Lodigiano, Ossago Lodigiano, Borghetto Lodigiano, Graffignana.

References

Cities and towns in Lombardy